The New York State Office of Tax Enforcement (OTE) is a law enforcement entity of the New York State Department of Taxation and Finance (DTF) that conducts criminal and civil investigations, investigators employed in the office carry firearms and have police powers to make arrests and execute search warrants.  The office is divided into two bureaus, the Petroleum, Alcohol and Tobacco Bureau (PATB) and the Revenue Crimes Bureau (RCB)  that was recently renamed to a newly formed Special Investigations Unit (SIU).

Petroleum, Alcohol and Tobacco Bureau
  
PATB is primarily concerned with excise taxes levied on petroleum, alcohol and tobacco. PATB also investigates other related taxes subject to evasion by regulated industries. These taxes include the petroleum business tax, highway use tax, and the sales and use tax on sales of regulated commodities. In addition, PATB is responsible for enforcement of the Cigarette Marketing Standards Act.

Special Investigations Unit

SIU focuses its efforts on non-compliance with personal income tax, sales tax, withholding tax and corporate tax.

Officers Killed in the Line Of Duty
Four officers of the New York State Office of Tax Enforcement have died in the line of duty, all of these deaths were due to the attacks of September 11, 2001.

References

External links
Official website
 Officer Down Memorial Page

State law enforcement agencies of New York (state)
Taxation in New York (state)
US state tax agencies